Ecsenius mandibularis, also known as the many-toothed blenny, Queensland combtooth blenny or Queensland blenny in Australia, is a species of combtooth blenny in the genus Ecsenius. It is found in coral reefs in the western Pacific ocean, including the southern edge of the Great Barrier Reef. It can reach a maximum length of 7.5 centimetres. Blennies in this species feed primarily off of plants, including benthic algae and weeds.

References
 McCulloch, A. R., 1923 (10 Dec.) Fishes from Australia and Lord Howe Island. No. 2. Records of the Australian Museum v. 14 (no. 2): 113–125, Pls. 14–16.

mandibularis
Fish described in 1923
Taxa named by Allan Riverstone McCulloch